Buck Beltzer Stadium (originally The Nebraska Diamond) was a college baseball stadium on the campus of the University of Nebraska–Lincoln in Lincoln, Nebraska. It primarily served as the home venue for the Nebraska Cornhuskers baseball team from 1979 until 2001, when the university constructed Hawks Field at Haymarket Park. It was named after Oren "Buck" Beltzer, a standout football and baseball player at Nebraska who was captain of both teams in 1909.

History
The stadium site, northeast of Memorial Stadium and adjacent to Interstate 180, was known as The Nebraska Diamond until the 1979 season, when it was renamed for Buck Beltzer after a donation from the Beltzer family allowed for the ballpark to be upgraded with an artificial turf infield, 1,000 permanent aluminum seats, covered dugouts, a press box, restrooms, and concession stands. Seating was increased to 1,500 the next year. Later upgrades included a new scoreboard in 1981; lights in 1989; and a new sound system in 1997.

The stadium's 1,500-seat capacity was expanded with additional bleacher sections shipped in for NCAA Championship games. The five NCAA Championship games hosted at Buck Beltzer Stadium produced its five largest-ever crowds. Nebraska's final game at the stadium was a 9–6 win over Rice to send the program to its first College World Series. Hawks Field, where the Cornhuskers would move the following year, had been finished prior to the tournament and was available to host games; however, the team elected to finish the season at Buck Beltzer Stadium.

By the time of its closing, Buck Beltzer Stadium was considered out-of-date and lacked many of the features common among major Division I college baseball venues. The artificial turf infield had fallen out of favor, despite several replacements since its initial installation in 1977. The stadium did not have a warning track or a permanent fence because, at the time, Nebraska's football team used the outfield to practice for games to be played on grass. These practices meant the outfield was often covered in divots, making ground balls difficult for outfielders to properly field (termed "the bounce of the Buck" or "the Buck bounce"). Despite its shortcomings, Buck Beltzer Stadium was generally well-liked by Nebraska's players and supporters due to its unique features and intimate environment.

Buck Beltzer Stadium was converted into outdoor football practice fields as part of the Hawks Championship Center before being demolished in its entirety in 2020 when the University of Nebraska began construction of a $315-million, 115,000-square foot football practice facility.

References

1979 establishments in Nebraska
2001 disestablishments in Nebraska
Baseball venues in Nebraska
Defunct college baseball venues in the United States
Nebraska Cornhuskers baseball